Steven Leigh Johnson (born 4 July 1983) is a former professional Australian rules footballer who played for the Geelong Football Club and the Greater Western Sydney Giants in the Australian Football League (AFL). He was selected by Geelong with pick 24 in the 2001 AFL Draft. His first few years were plagued with inconsistency, injury and off-field problems. A medium-sized forward, Johnson is renowned for his freakish ability on the field, where he has consistently wowed fans with his penchant for extraordinary goals.

Early life and junior football
Johnson was born and raised in Wangaratta, Victoria. He played junior football with the Tigers in the Wangaratta Junior Football League and then with Wangaratta Football Club, before moving onto the Murray Bushrangers in the TAC Cup.

AFL career

Geelong

Johnson was suspended by his club for the first five matches of the 2007 season after he was arrested for public drunkenness in Wangaratta on 24 December 2006 - a charge which was later dropped. He returned in Round 6 against  where he went on to contribute 21 possessions and two goals in a match Geelong won by 157 points. He went on to post career-best numbers across the board, capped off by All-Australian selection on the half-forward flank in September. His 2007 season was capped off when Johnson lead the Cats to victory in the Grand Final, collecting a premiership medallion, and winning the Norm Smith Medal for best on ground in the Grand Final. Johnson was hailed as a feel-good story for the year, with a good example of a player reforming after disciplinary action.

Early in 2008, Johnson lost his drivers' licence and was sentenced to 50 hours working with the Transport Accident Commission after he was clocked in over 70 km/h over the speed limit in a 50 zone. Teammate Shannon Byrnes was in the car at the time. He had yet another stellar season on-field in 2008, kicking 49 home-and-away season goals and earning a spot on the forward flank in the All-Australian team of 2008. He gathered 34 disposals in the Cats' Grand Final loss to Hawthorn.

In the 2009 AFL season, he played 18 matches and kicked 40 goals, finishing tenth in the Geelong best and fairest award. He was a member of the Cats 2009 Premiership winning team.

In 2011, 'Stevie Wonder', struggled to consistently produce the captivating form that had won him All Australian selection in previous years. He was still a force though, gaining recognition by being honoured in the initial All-Australian squad of 40. His season nearly came to an abrupt end, when during the third quarter of the Preliminary Final between Geelong and West Coast, he appeared to sustain a serious injury to his left knee. Racing against the clock in order to gain fitness for the Grand Final against the Magpies, it was heavily speculated that Johnson would be unable to gain full fitness in time. For almost the entire week, whilst his teammates trained in the spotlight, Johnson spent time up in Melbourne in a hyperbaric chamber. He recovered, and played a vital part in the Cats win over the Pies. He went on to kick 4 goals amongst 14 possessions, thus claiming his third premiership medallion.

GWS Giants
In his first match against his old club in Round 2, Johnson kicked two goals as his new club won by 13 points.
On 28 September 2016 Johnson announced he had signed a one-year contract extension with GWS, after missing their preliminary final loss due to suspension. Johnson played the final game of his career in the 2017 Preliminary Final, where he collected 15 disposals and 4 marks in a 36-point loss to Richmond.

Statistics

|-
|- style="background-color: #EAEAEA"
! scope="row" style="text-align:center" | 2002
|style="text-align:center;"|
| 20 || 12 || 16 || 12 || 101 || 50 || 151 || 40 || 28 || 1.3 || 1.0 || 8.4 || 4.2 || 12.6 || 3.3 || 2.3
|-
! scope="row" style="text-align:center" | 2003
|style="text-align:center;"|
| 20 || 15 || 23 || 12 || 122 || 49 || 171 || 54 || 29 || 1.5 || 0.8 || 8.1 || 3.3 || 11.4 || 3.6 || 1.9
|- style="background-color: #EAEAEA"
! scope="row" style="text-align:center" | 2004
|style="text-align:center;"|
| 20 || 13 || 21 || 19 || 143 || 54 || 197 || 58 || 31 || 1.6 || 1.5 || 11.0 || 4.2 || 15.2 || 4.5 || 2.4
|-
! scope="row" style="text-align:center" | 2005
|style="text-align:center;"|
| 20 || 12 || 18 || 15 || 129 || 51 || 180 || 59 || 19 || 1.5 || 1.3 || 10.8 || 4.3 || 15.0 || 4.9 || 1.6
|- style="background-color: #EAEAEA"
! scope="row" style="text-align:center" | 2006
|style="text-align:center;"|
| 20 || 15 || 30 || 13 || 139 || 60 || 199 || 70 || 22 || 2.0 || 0.9 || 9.3 || 4.0 || 13.3 || 4.7 || 1.5
|-
! scope="row" style="text-align:center" | 2007
|style="text-align:center;"|
| 20 || 20 || 49 || 33 || 286 || 86 || 372 || 144 || 44 || 2.5 || 1.7 || 14.3 || 4.3 || 18.6 || 7.2 || 2.2
|- style="background-color: #EAEAEA"
! scope="row" style="text-align:center" | 2008
|style="text-align:center;"|
| 20 || 25 || 53 || 31 || 333 || 174 || 507 || 147 || 65 || 2.1 || 1.2 || 13.3 || 7.0 || 20.3 || 5.9 || 2.6
|-
! scope="row" style="text-align:center" | 2009
|style="text-align:center;"|
| 20 || 18 || 40 || 38 || 255 || 103 || 358 || 112 || 44 || 2.2 || 2.1 || 14.2 || 5.7 || 19.9 || 6.2 || 2.4
|- style="background-color: #EAEAEA"
! scope="row" style="text-align:center" | 2010
|style="text-align:center;"|
| 20 || 22 || 63 || 36 || 274 || 136 || 410 || 131 || 50 || 2.9 || 1.6 || 12.5 || 6.2 || 18.6 || 6.0 || 2.3
|-
! scope="row" style="text-align:center" | 2011
|style="text-align:center;"|
| 20 || 23 || 50 || 37 || 319 || 195 || 514 || 143 || 84 || 2.2 || 1.6 || 13.9 || 8.5 || 22.3 || 6.2 || 3.7
|- style="background-color: #EAEAEA"
! scope="row" style="text-align:center" | 2012
|style="text-align:center;"|
| 20 || 21 || 19 || 17 || 299 || 166 || 465 || 117 || 94 || 0.9 || 0.8 || 14.2 || 7.9 || 22.1 || 5.6 || 4.5
|-
! scope="row" style="text-align:center" | 2013
|style="text-align:center;"|
| 20 || 19 || 23 || 23 || 315 || 231 || 546 || 108 || 87 || 1.2 || 1.2 || 16.6 || 12.2 || 28.7 || 5.7 || 4.6
|- style="background-color: #EAEAEA"
! scope="row" style="text-align:center" | 2014
|style="text-align:center;"|
| 20 || 18 || 17 || 14 || 265 || 199 || 464 || 92 || 94 || 0.9 || 0.8 || 14.7 || 11.1 || 25.8 || 5.1 || 5.2
|-
! scope="row" style="text-align:center" | 2015
|style="text-align:center;"|
| 20 || 20 || 30 || 25 || 256 || 156 || 412 || 99 || 46 || 1.5 || 1.3 || 12.8 || 7.8 || 20.6 || 5.0 || 2.3
|- style="background-color: #EAEAEA"
! scope="row" style="text-align:center" | 2016
|style="text-align:center;"|
| 17 || 22 || 43 || 26 || 255 || 152 || 407 || 93 || 63 || 2.0 || 1.2 || 11.6 || 6.9 || 18.5 || 4.2 || 2.9
|-
! scope="row" style="text-align:center" | 2017
|style="text-align:center;"|
| 17 || 18 || 21 || 16 || 159 || 115 || 274 || 79 || 50 || 1.2 || 0.9 || 8.8 || 6.4 || 15.2 || 4.4 || 2.8
|- class="sortbottom"
! colspan=3| Career
! 293
! 516
! 367
! 3650
! 1977
! 5627
! 1546
! 851
! 1.8
! 1.3
! 12.5
! 6.7
! 19.2
! 5.3
! 2.9
|}

Career highlights 
AFL
AFL Premiership Player (2007, 2009, 2011)
Norm Smith Medal (2007)
All-Australian (2007–2008, 2010)

Geelong 
VFL Premiership Player (2002)
Geelong Reserves Best First Year Player (2002)

TAC Cup
All-Australian U/18 (2001)
Vic Country U/18 (2001)

Coaching 
Not long after his retirement as an AFL player, Johnson joined the Sydney Swans as an assistant coach.

References

External links 

 Steve Johnson official website
 

Geelong Football Club players
Geelong Football Club Premiership players
Greater Western Sydney Giants players
1983 births
Living people
All-Australians (AFL)
Norm Smith Medal winners
People from Wangaratta
Australian rules footballers from Victoria (Australia)
Murray Bushrangers players
Wangaratta Football Club players
Australia international rules football team players
Three-time VFL/AFL Premiership players